Just Love Me is a 2006 Polish romantic comedy film directed by Ryszard Zatorski. It was awarded the Amber Lion at the Gdynia Film Festival for the highest-grossing film of the year, and was nominated for the Polish Film Award for Best Costumes.

The film was shot from August to October 2005 in Warsaw.

Plot 
Michał is a co-owner of an architectural company. He lives in a loose relationship with Agata, who is the second co-owner of the company. A seven-year-old girl, Michalina, knocks on the door of Michał's apartment, claiming to be his daughter. At first, Michał doesn't want to believe the child's words, but then it turns out that she was telling the truth. The man decides to find the girl's mother.

Overview 
The film became a hit in Polish cinemas, where it was watched by over 1.6 million viewers. Just Love Me, however, met with unfavorable reactions from critics – the film was accused of naivety and predictability of the script, shallowness of characters, intrusive product placement, poor acting and idealizing reality. However, the role of Julia Wróblewska were praised.

Cast 
 Maciej Zakościelny – Michal
 Agnieszka Grochowska – Julia
 Agnieszka Dygant – Agata
  – Michalina
 Grażyna Szapołowska – Julia's mother
 Jan Frycz – Prezes
 Marcin Bosak – Antoni
 Dominika Kluźniak – Lucja
 Tomasz Karolak – Ludwik
 Przemysław Sadowski – Police Officer – Czeslaw
 Danuta Stenka – Judyta Katarzyna Kozlowska
 Artur Żmijewski – Adam

References

External links 

2006 romantic comedy films
2006 films
Polish romantic comedy films